Everhood, or Everhood: An Ineffable Tale of the Inexpressible Divine Moments of Truth, is a 2021 video game developed by Chris Nordgren and Jordi Roca. The game's plot involves a red doll-person trying to recover their stolen arm from Gold Pig, an immortal inhabitant of the land of Everhood. Along the way, the player allies with a small creature by the name of Blue Thief, and encounters a variety of characters who either attempt to aid or deter the player on their quest to retrieve Red's arm. It was released on Microsoft Windows and Nintendo Switch on March 4, 2021.

Gameplay

Everhood was described by Screen Rant as an adventure RPG that focused on having its battle system based on a rhythm game as opposed to a standard strategy or turn-based combat system. Similar to Guitar Hero, the battlefield consists of five lanes that the player can move between freely. Each enemy in the game has their own battle theme, and will time their attacks to the song's beat. However, unlike standard rhythm games, the player is meant to dodge the enemy's attacks rather than hitting them. At the beginning of the game, attacks can only be avoided by jumping over them or dodging to the side, but after acquiring Red's stolen arm, the player can absorb attacks and fire them back at the enemy. Initially, the player must survive for the entire length of the song to progress, but later-game battles loop until the enemy's health is drained by deflecting their attacks.

Plot

Setting 
Everhood's world is composed by multiple separate areas, such as a carnival, a mushroom forest and a desert. Many of these areas are not directly connected, but can be accessed from the central Cosmic Hub through different doors, in a similar fashion to Yume Nikki. These areas are inhabited by a diverse cast of characters, most of them named after colors. This is the case of the player character itself, Red, as well as Blue Thief, Professor Orange, and the Green, Purple and Brown Mages among others. None of these characters has a defined gender.

It is gradually revealed that Everhood is the tattered remains of an ancient realm of Immortals. Its remaining inhabitants mostly don't enjoy existence, but some are trapped by their fear of oblivion.  The player must choose what is the right thing to do - use Red's arm to kill the inhabitants, even the unwilling ones, or abandon their quest.

Story 
At the beginning of the game, a disembodied voice directly addresses the player, asking them to "abandon their humanity and accept immortality" in order to enter the land of Everhood. After accepting, the player is given control over Red, a mute wooden doll who awakens after their arm is stolen by Blue Thief. Red's other limbs are strewn about the ground, but quickly reattach themselves, allowing Red to begin following the thief's trail out of the forest. They soon meet Frog, who engages in a battle serving as the game's tutorial. Upon completing the fight, Frog introduces save points (which take the form of street lights) before clearing the way.

Red continues forward and quickly arrives at a Nightclub. Guards and patrons bar Red's way to a backroom where the hostile Gold Pig, who keeps Red's missing arm, awaits. Gold Pig throws Red into an incinerator, an almost-unwinnable battle which does not end the game if their health is fully depleted.

Upon succumbing, Red is transported to the post-mortem world, where they must survive a strange battle with mysterious figures and gnomes on a psychedelic playfield. Following this the voice once again speaks directly to the player and offers them an "Absolute Truth" before returning Red to the now-broken incinerator. These events can be skipped entirely if the player manages to survive the incinerator battle.

Red exits the incinerator, and discovers that Gold Pig has stolen Blue Thief's legs and abandoned them.  They set out together to find Gold Pig, retrieve their stolen limbs, and understand the nature of Everhood. They soon arrive at the Cosmic Hub, and begin exploring the different worlds located behind each door. Throughout their adventure, Red and Blue meet and are attacked by different characters, including the sassy Green Mage, the slime-like siblings Flan and Muck, and the stoic Rasta Beast. They eventually venture through Gold Pig's fortress and confront them, enduring their attacks until Gold Pig surrenders out of exhaustion. Pressured by their own former allies, Gold Pig yields and agrees to returning Red's arm and Blue Thief's legs.

Red proceeds to recover their arm, triggering the credits. However, these are interrupted shortly after starting by Frog, who notices Red having recovered their arm. Frog then reveals the true nature of the world, explaining that its inhabitants are eons-old immortals, and tasks the player with ending their existence, and the entire world's with them. A second tutorial battle ensues with Frog teaching Red how to deflect incoming attacks and shoot them back against their enemies, making it possible to kill them.

Red is then returned to Gold Pig's Temple, and begins their mission to end the realm. They can now engage and kill the characters they have met along the way, with many of them refusing to die and only a few accepting their fate. A key item keeps track of how many alive inhabitants remain, and counts down with every kill. This counter can go down to 1, at which point the normal ending's final battles can be accessed.

Normal ending 
After killing every possible character, with one more life still left to take, Red may contact the Lost Spirits, stranded souls who make cryptic appearances at various points throughout Everhood up until that point. The Lost Spirits instruct Red to destroy the doors leading to the world's various regions, and then send them to kill the final immortal, which is revealed to be the Sun (seen under the guise of a white rabbit for most of the game). Red ultimately defeats it, triggering the end of the world. Red then encounters the disembodied voice from earlier, representing the Universe itself and taking the form of a cube. In battle, the player is confronted with all the lives they ended, and then attacked by the Lost Spirits. Several of them then take the appearance of deceased characters, with one of them (Rasta Beast) viciously attacking red in an attempt to kill them. Suddenly, a humanoid named Pink emerges from Red's body, which immediately falls apart. Red turns out to have been only a vessel to Pink's soul the whole time.

Pink then tries to explain the purpose of Red's actions to the spirits, but they reveal that it was Pink themselves who actually killed them, as Red's body was destroyed in the incinerator. The spirits then vanish, along with Red's remains, leaving Pink alone in despair. However, after the player is prompted to input a Konami-code-like sequence, a bandage from Red's clothing reappears in front of Pink, who ties it around their eyes as a blindfold. Purportedly under Red's (and by extension, the player's) control, a calmed Pink explores a deserted landscape and arrives at a cottage. Inside is Frog, waiting to guide the protagonist through the final step in erasing the world from existence, and a door leading downstairs to the underground depths.

Pink descends to find themselves in what appears to be a subterranean lake. They must then allow themselves to sink in the water, apparently ending their life. This begins the final battle against the Universe, again in the form of a cube, where Pink must survive and deflect incoming attacks as reality begins to glitch out. As the Universe's health decreases, the glitching becomes more and more intense, until Pink defeats it and finally puts an end to the world.

As Pink wonders whether they are dead, a being resembling Buddha introduces them to the Waiting Room, a plane of existence where all the fallen characters can be talked to before their definitive departure. After interacting with everyone the player has met across their adventure, talking to Buddha will begin a farewell battle, seeing all of the game's characters say their goodbyes before ending the game. The first time this ending is achieved, a final cutscene featuring the Universe's voice plays, hinting at secrets yet to be found and unlocking the New Game+ mode.

Alternate endings 
Several other endings can optionally be unlocked in different playthroughs.

 Frog's Wrath: If Red avoids killing anyone, speaks to the Forest Spirit -one of the few characters willing to pass away- and refuses to take their life, a special door will appear at the Cosmic Hub. Entering it and traversing the path found afterwards leads to an encounter with Frog, who chastises the player for refusing to carry out their mission and attacks them with a plethora of musical instruments. Upon defeating Frog, both them and Red are addressed by the disembodied voice, who bids farewell to the former and destroys the latter. The player can reload the game and continue playing for other endings.
 Dev Gnomes: Certain optional enemies can be defeated to earn three different gems. Upon entering the Cosmic Hub, there is a chance for a special statue to spawn. If the player interacts with it and inserts all three gems, they will be transported to a battle against the game's developers and the Gnomes from the post-mortem world fight.
 Corridor: After recovering their arm, Red can enter the basement in Green Mage's house and traverse a long corridor composed by hundreds of rooms. They ultimately reach a hidden room where Red can opt to stop killing, in which case their body is disassembled and remains there.
 Cat God endings: In the New Game+ mode, unlocked by obtaining the normal ending once, a new character named Sam invites the player to scavenge a bounty in a hidden place. Sam leads them to the domains of Cat God, who is fought as a secret boss. If the player fails to deplete their health before the music is over, Cat God spares Red's life and allows them to proceed. Sam and Red can enter the lair to discover a console (which can be played with) and a door leading to a second incinerator which is scripted to kill the player. After this happens, a cutscene revealing part of Pink's background plays. If Red manages to kill Cat God, a different ending plays with the disembodied voice addressing the player one more time.

Reception

Zoey Handley of Destructoid praised the music in the game, but noted that the story threw in too many plot twists and critiqued spelling errors and long load times within the game. Nintendo World Report's Jordan Rudek praised the game's rhythm-based combat and humor and called it "an instant classic", while also noting the grammar and spelling errors within the game and long loading times.

References

2021 video games
Adventure games
Indie video games
Nintendo Switch games
Retro-style video games
Rhythm games
Role-playing video games
Single-player video games
Video games developed in Spain
Video games developed in Sweden
Windows games